Hollin Hills is a historic district and neighborhood in Fairfax County, Virginia. It is located primarily in the Fort Hunt area with some portions remaining today in the Hybla Valley and Groveton areas of the county since a shift for census purposes prior to 2010.  Residents have Alexandria mailing addresses with ZIP codes 22306 or 22307.

Principally designed by Charles M. Goodman and developed by Robert C. Davenport in the 1940s, it was one of the Washington, D.C. area's first post-war modernist architecture developments, combined with natural landscape designs between 1949–1971. Davenport purchased the original  of hilly, undeveloped land for $550/acre (present value:$/acre). As home sales and national acclaim grew, he then acquired another  in 1956, and constructed more homes until the "New Hollin Hills" was completed in 1971. In all, roughly 450 houses with contemporary construction techniques and landscape plans were established in northern Virginia, offsetting the area’s more common Colonial Revival homes. Today, the neighborhood is known primarily for its mid-century modern architecture homes, each are uniquely oriented on its lot to maximize its privacy and landscape view, with sight lines intentionally chosen to enhance the common space shared by each structure.  These design tenants have remained very cohesive because of a long-standing design review committee that advises on building or modification of existing houses, and starting in 2022, its designation as the Hollin Hills Historic Overlay District (HOD), which requires modifications and additions to be reviewed by Fairfax County Architectural Review Board.

The Hollin Hills Historic District is a  residential neighborhood encompassing 468 contributing buildings, five contributing sites, and three contributing structures for its 2013 designation in the Virginia Landmarks Register and the National Register of Historic Places. The boundaries of Hollin Hills reflect the initial purchase of the 225 acres in 1946 as the site for a residential suburb and the neighborhood’s 1956 expansion by Robert Davenport that added 101 acres to the southwest of the original section. The historic district encompasses all of the present  of Hollin Hills, composed of single-family dwellings, parks, and recreational areas.

History

Early history 
Thomas Fairfax, 6th Lord Fairfax of Cameron appointed land agents who lived on the Northern Neck to sell parcels from what became known as the Fairfax Grant. The land agents for the proprietor included Philip Ludwell, George Brent, and William Fitzhugh. They processed the paperwork for Northern Neck grants (i.e., land sales) rather than the Secretary and Governor in Jamestown/Williamsburg. Based on pre-1742 maps of the Patents and Northern Neck Grants of Fairfax County, the land of present-day Hollin Hills sat on land once owned by land agent, George Brent.

Based on an 1862 Union engineer map (VREF 975.52 U 1862 DC.), known as the “McDowell map”, Hollin Hills sat near Sparrow Hill, which later formed Popkins Farm.

1949 to present 

When Davenport acquired the original tract, he intended the name "Hollin Hills" as a variation of the 18th-century Hollin Hall Plantation, originally owned by George Mason, one of the Founding Fathers of the United States, known as the "Father of the Bill of Rights." General Mason named his lands after an English estate of his mother's family. Some of the Hollin Hall plantation buildings still stand on Sherwood Hall Lane.

Modernist architecture 
Davenport hired D.C.-based architect Charles M. Goodman (who also designed the Washington National Airport) to design the community; Goodman hired landscape architect Lou "Barney" Voigt to his firm in 1950. Together, the trio of builder/developer, architect and landscape architect chose to design each home with lots no smaller than one-third of an acre. Between 1949 and 1961, Charles Goodman designed eight modern unit types with variations in square footage and interior amenities, comprising 15 different combinations for Hollin Hills. During construction, many trees were retained to block sight lines, and houses were built at angles to ensure privacy. The popularity of the homes, which feature huge expanses of glass, established Goodman as a nationally acclaimed guru of modern architecture. Davenport named some streets to complement the community name, while others were named after family members: Martha's Road for his mother and Rebecca Drive for his daughter. Elba Road was named after one of his prize bulls.

Throughout the community, several custom designs, additions and modifications were constructed beyond the unit types creating an “architectural laboratory” for modern home design. Only 23 were ever built, including one in Hollin Hills, which has since been restored. This Elba Road-home is one of the district’s NRHP contributing properties and is listed separately within the Virginia Department of Historic Resources’ ‘’Notable Modern Architecture in Virginia, ca. 1940-1990’’ listing.

Environment 
In 1950, Goodman employed Harvard-trained landscape designer Lou "Barney" Voight to develop landscape plans for homes that optimized their home-sitting, the rolling hills and natural wood setting. After his untimely death at age 37 in 1953, he was followed by Daniel Urban Kiley and Eric Paepcke who focused on more geometric designs. Each provided property owners with landscaping plans intended to harmonize the contours of the land and highlight each building's individual design and siting. Depending on the address and date of construction, residents of today may obtain copies of their original landscape plans from the Library of Congress, Harvard’s Frances Loeb Library, or George Mason University’s Fenwick Library. 

Stormwater throughout Hollin Hills is part of the Little Hunting Creek watershed that flows to the Potomac River and onto the Chesapeake Bay. Starting in April 2021 after months of debate, Fairfax County closed access to the parks and began stream restoration projects designed to restore and stabilize the dangerously eroded perennial streambeds in Goodman and Brickelmaier Parks and restore the parks to safety, ecological health, and natural beauty, which was heavily debated by residents, ecological experts and the county. The two parks were reopened in November 2022.

Infrastructure

Transportation 
Motor vehicles are the most common form of transportation to and from Hollin Hills via its 11 ingress/egress points. Most houses do not feature garages, and instead include carports that may have been part of Goodman's plans or added via additions by Goodman associate Eason Cross, Jr., and other architects throughout the years. Many homes in the original 225-acre tract have gravel parking pads at the edge of the street, in addition to driveways. County restrictions prohibit the parking of watercraft, motor homes, campers, trailers, and other large vehicles on public streets, as the community is within the Mount Vernon Community Parking District.

Virtually all public roads (interstate, primary and secondary) in Fairfax County are maintained by the Virginia Department of Transportation (VDOT). The county's public bus service, Fairfax Connector, has nearby connections via Route 101 (Fort Hunt–Mt. Vernon) and Route 152 (Groveton–Fort Hunt) routes, located near the intersection of Fort Hunt Rd and Paul Spring Rd, near the Hollin Hills Pool and community entrance. The Huntington station serves as the nearest rapid transit terminal of the Washington Metro (WMATA) system.  Ronald Reagan Washington National Airport (DCA), located approximately 8 miles north, is the closest airport for residents.

Utilities 
Trash and recycling collection throughout Fairfax County is performed either by the county or private collection company. The entirety of Hollin Hills is located within the County Collection service area.

Dominion Energy is the primary supplier of electricity to area residents.  Homes with natural gas are supplied Washington Gas. The Fairfax County Water Authority (or simply, Fairfax Water) is the primary water company for potable water supply to homes and fire hydrants. 

Regulated wireline telephone service (aka, land line), digital/cable TV service, and residential Internet service is available with Comcast, Cox and Verizon.

Government 
For elections, the majority of Hollin Hills is located within the Kirkside (608) voting precinct and the Hollin Meadows Elementary School is the polling place. For others, residents are served by the Bucknell (604) voting precinct and its Bryant Center polling place. 

 In the U.S. House of Representatives, residents are represented by Virginia's 8th congressional district.

 For representation in the Virginia General Assembly, the community rests inside Virginia's 44th House of Delegates district and Virginia's 36th Senate district, for State Delegate and State Senator, respectively.

 At the county (or district) level, citizens are served by the Mount Vernon Magisterial District of Fairfax County for representation amongst the Fairfax County Board of Supervisors, and other district representatives on a variety of boards and commissions within the county. Mount Vernon Station No. 9, located in Sherwood Hall Lane, is the nearest response unit for emergency services from the Fairfax County Fire and Rescue Department (FCFRD). Of the eight police stations of the Fairfax County Police Department (FCPD), Mount Vernon District Police Station is nearest the community.

 At the community level, the Civic Association of Hollin Hills (CAHH) is a member association of the Mount Vernon Council of Citizens’ Associations, which was formed to represent and promote the interests of its member associations and to further the common good and general welfare of the residents of the Mount Vernon Magisterial District.

Education 
Within the community’s first five years, construction began in June 1954 on Hollin Hills Elementary School, located adjacent to the community entrance along Fort Hunt Road, immediately north of the intersection with Paul Spring Road.  The school was built at a cost of $275,964 (present value: $) and opened its doors to students on September 6, 1955. In the subsequent years, the originally all-white school was desegregated in 1964. By the late 1970s, enrollment numbers had declined and the school was closed in June 1980. The buildings have since been converted into the Paul Spring Retirement Community living center. 

As of 2023, public elementary and secondary education of resident youth is provided by Fairfax County Public Schools (FCPS) with school board representation from the Mount Vernon District. FCPS schools serving the community are Hollin Meadows Elementary School, Sandburg Middle School and West Potomac High School (Wolverines). There are also many private schools in the area, such as Bishop Ireton High School (Cardinals) and St. Stephen's & St. Agnes School (Saints).

The nearest public libraries to Hollin Hills are the Sherwood Regional Library and Martha Washington Library served by the Fairfax County Public Library (FCPL) system. In addition, several residents have installed and maintain neighborhood book exchanges and chartered Little Free Library locations throughout the neighborhood, often stylized in the shape of mid-century modern homes found throughout the community.

Civic association 
The Civic Association of Hollin Hills (CAHH) is a volunteer neighborhood organization structured to promote the common good of the community. It is led by a nine-member, democratically elected Board of Directors which manages a variety of community activities including a monthly newsletter, a resident/owner directory, an architectural design review committee, management and oversight of 30 acres of parks, the Hollin Hills Pool, Hollin Hills Pickleball and Tennis Club, and the biennial House and Garden Tour.

Parks 
Resident volunteers with efforts of the CAHH Parks Committee and the Friends of Hollin Hills organize to enhance park amenities and to control non-native, invasive species such as English ivy, multiflora rose, and tea viburnum. The seven CAHH parks include:

 Paul Spring Park–a  park that runs along the north side of Paul Spring Road, located in the Groveton area. According to the county website, Paul Spring Park is located in a FEMA-designated "100 year floodplain" (aka, Zone AE) and Chesapeake Bay Resource Protection Area (RPA) since 1993.
 Voight Memorial Park–a rectangular,  park located between Fort Hunt Road and Rippon Road at the eastern edge of Hollin Hills in the Fort Hunt area, abutting the Hollin Hill Pool & Swim Club. The main portion of the park includes a children’s playground, with a bocce court located along Rippon Road. Voight Park is located within FEMA Zone AE floodplain and the Chesapeake Bay Preservation Area RPA since 1993.
 McCalley Park–a small  park named after Charles R. “Mac” McCalley, the construction foreman of Hollin Hills from 1949 to 1971. It is located at the southwest corner of Paul Spring Road and Rippon Road across from Voight Park. This land was once the site of one of the originally built homes but often suffered from flooding. As a result, the structure (formerly 1801 Paul Spring Rd) was raised and the property purchased by Fairfax County Board of Supervisors in 1990. The entire park is located within the Chesapeake Bay Preservation Area RPA with some portions within a FEMA Zone AE floodplain.
 Charles Goodman Park & Trail–originally named East Stafford Park and renamed after the neighborhood's master architect and planner. The sloping, narrow park is located in the Fort Hunt area and runs roughly north-south from Paul Spring Road to Martha's Road; it can be accessed at either end. A riparian zone exists along its stream. The park is similar to Brickelmaier Park in that it is mostly forested land following the Paul Spring Branch stream with a riparian corridor.
 Brickelmaier Park & Trail–the park originally was known as West Stafford Park, but was renamed in 1978 in honor of George Brickelmaier, an original resident of Hollin Hills who worked with developer Robert Davenport. This Fort Hunt area park is 3.104 acres and runs north-south from Paul Spring Road to Popkins Lane, and can be accessed at either end. The park is mostly forested land that followed the natural watercourse of the Paul Spring Branch stream with a riparian corridor which buffers the stream. The park is within a designated RPA since 2003.
 Wildlife Sanctuary–a level,  tract was subdivided for development in the 1960s, but never improved. It is located in the Hybla Valley area and Hybla Valley Farm land tract along Delafield Place and west of Elba Road. While it was acquired through a land trade with Fairfax County in 1976, it is a part of the HOD. The majority of the land is located within the Chesapeake Bay RPA since 2003.
 Sutton Potter Park–a narrow, sloping  rectangular park at the western edge of Hollin Hills (in the Hybla Valley area). The park entrance is located via path in the 7400 block of Range Road. This park was acquired in 1966 as part of a land swap with the county; it is located outside the historic district and HOD.

Lastly, other nearby parks inclusive of the county HOD but located outside of the state and national historic district boundaries are White Oaks Park and two portions of the Paul Springs Valley Stream Park, all of which is maintained by the Fairfax County Park Authority (FCPA).

Swim and racquet clubs 
Goodman and Davenport originally planned and submitted to Fairfax County for zoning approval in 1952 that Hollin Hills would have its own shopping center and gas station; however, the county rejected the plan and the shopping center is never built on the corner of Paul Spring Road and Fort Hunt Road. The site is now the home of the Hollin Hills pool, and tennis and pickleball courts. The Hollin Hills Swim Team, established in 1956, is one of the nine charter members of the Northern Virginia Swim League (NVSL). The Hollin Hills Bluefish compete in NVSL Division 14.

In 1955, the community formed a tennis club and four tennis courts were built and remained in active use for many years until the 1990s when period flooding from the Paul Spring Branch damaged the courts to become nearly unplayable. In 2021, the community voted to replace half the tennis courts. In 2022, six pickleball courts were built atop two of the tennis courts; the courts are managed by the CAHH Hollin Hills Pickleball and Tennis Club. Both the swim and racquet clubs offer resident and non-resident membership options.

In 1964, the Hollin Meadows Swim and Tennis Club at 2500 Woodlawn Trail is located near the "new" Hollin Hills area and was once part of CAHH. Today, the HMSTC is separate from the CAHH as a private-membership based club operating a 5-acre complex in a wooded area, bordering the historic district boundaries.

Awards and recognition

The structures and community of Hollin Hills has won many architectural and landscape design awards beginning with the Revere Quality House award from the Southwest Research Institute in 1950.  After more than 25 years, the community was the inaugural awardee of the Test-of-Time Award (Residential category) from the Virginia Society of the American Institute of Architects (AIA) for its lasting appeal in site-planning, house sitting and architecture for houses on Stafford Road.

With its last home constructed in 1971, the community's first significant and lasting recognition as a historic community occurred quickly thereafter with its 1972 inclusion in the Fairfax County's Inventory of Historic Sites. Next in December 2004, Hollin Hills is prominently listed within The Contemporary House and The Contemporary Landscape Design sections of the National Register of Historic Places (NRHP) multiple property submission for Historic Residential Suburbs in the United States, 1830–1960. Subsequently, the Board of the Civic Association of Hollin Hills (CAHH) sought and was granted state and national designations when Hollin Hills was added to the Virginia Landmarks Register in late June 2013, followed by its September 2013 inclusion as a National Register of Historic Places national historic district.

Notable residents

Over the decades, this mid-century modern community has attracted artists, architects, politicians, lawyers, doctors and numerous other individuals typical of the metropolitan DC region, including and the production designers for Mad Men, Dan Bishop and Jeremy Conway. Notable residents include:

 Reginald Bartholomew—diplomat
 Gilbert Wheeler Beebe—epidemiologist and statistician
 James Carroll—author, historian, and journalist
 Joseph Carroll—military officer (Lt. General); original settler of Hollin Hills (1950–58)
 Bernard B. Fall—prominent war correspondent, historian, political scientist, and expert on Indochina during the 1950s and 1960s
 Roberta Flack—singer 
 Noel Gayler—naval officer (Admiral), 6th director of the National Security Agency
 Philip Hirschkop—civil rights lawyer
 Paul Krizek—politician; House of Delegates–District 44.
 Ronald F. Lee—principal architect of the national historic preservation program
 James G. O'Hara—former U.S. Representative 
 Pat Roberts—retired U.S. Senator
 Salvatore R. Martoche—political appointee and judge
 Gil Scott-Heron—jazz poet and musician 
 David McCullough—author
 William "Bill" Green Miller—ambassador 
 Richard M. Moose—executive and diplomat
 Carl C. Mose—sculptor
 Helen W. Nies–judge
 Steve Novosel—jazz bassist and educator
 Michael Sorkin—architectural and urban critic, designer, and educator
 Kathleen Mary Spagnolo—artist<ref

References

Further reading

External links

Official website
Hollin Hills Pickleball and Tennis Club
Hollin Hills Pool
Hollin Hills Home & Garden Tour
Friends of Hollin Hills

Houses on the National Register of Historic Places in Virginia
Historic districts on the National Register of Historic Places in Virginia
Historic American Buildings Survey in Virginia
Historic districts in Fairfax County, Virginia
Modern Movement architecture in the United States
Modernist architecture in Virginia
Populated places in Fairfax County, Virginia
Unincorporated communities in Virginia
Washington metropolitan area
Neighborhoods in Virginia
Geography of Fairfax County, Virginia
National Register of Historic Places in Fairfax County, Virginia
Houses in Fairfax County, Virginia